Iron Mountain is a  mountain summit located in Mount Rainier National Park in Pierce County of Washington state. Part of the Cascade Range, it is situated near the base of the Success Cleaver, overlooking Indian Henry's Hunting Ground. Its nearest higher peak is Copper Mountain,  to the north. The summit provides views of Mount Rainier, Mount Adams, Mount St. Helens, Mount Wow, and peaks of the Tatoosh Range. Precipitation runoff from Iron Mountain drains into Tahoma Creek, Devils Dream Creek, and Fishers Horn Pipe Creek, which are all tributaries of the Nisqually River. There were great hopes in the late 1800s that mines on Mount Rainier could be a source of precious metals such as copper, silver, and gold. Dark reddish rock found on Iron Mountain was thought to be iron or iron oxide. Its name was officially adopted in 1932 by the United States Board on Geographic Names.

Climate
Iron Mountain is located in the marine west coast climate zone of western North America. Most weather fronts originate in the Pacific Ocean, and travel northeast toward the Cascade Mountains. As fronts approach, they are forced upward by the peaks of the Cascade Range (Orographic lift), causing them to drop their moisture in the form of rain or snowfall onto the Cascades. As a result, the west side of the Cascades experiences high precipitation, especially during the winter months in the form of snowfall. During winter months, weather is usually cloudy, but, due to high pressure systems over the Pacific Ocean that intensify during summer months, there is often little or no cloud cover during the summer.

See also

 Geography of Washington (state)
 Geology of the Pacific Northwest

References

External links

 Weather forecast: Iron Mountain
 National Park Service web site: Mount Rainier National Park
 Flickr photo: Iron Mountain seen from Copper Mountain

Cascade Range
Mountains of Pierce County, Washington
Mountains of Washington (state)
Mount Rainier National Park
North American 1000 m summits